The Big Sky Conference men's basketball tournament took place from March 7–11, 2009. The winner, Portland State, advanced to the NCAA tournament.  Teams were re-seeded after the first round.

Sources
Big Sky Conference – MBB Notes

References

Big Sky Conference men's basketball tournament
Tournament
Big Sky Conference men's basketball tournament
Big Sky Conference men's basketball tournament
Basketball competitions in Ogden, Utah
College sports tournaments in Utah